Brian Roche (born May 5, 1973) is a former American football tight end in the National Football League for the San Diego Chargers, Kansas City Chiefs, and Dallas Cowboys after having been drafted as the 81st overall draft pick by the San Diego Chargers in the 1996 NFL Draft.  He was a former AP and Football News All American at San Jose State with 68 catches and 729 yards his senior year.  He played in the East-West Shrine Game and Hula Bowl All Star Games after his senior season as well as attended the NFL Scouting Combine in Indianapolis, Indiana.

References

1973 births
American football tight ends
Cal Poly Mustangs football players
Kansas City Chiefs players
Living people
Players of American football from California
San Diego Chargers players
Sportspeople from Downey, California
San Jose State Spartans football players